1901 in Argentine football saw champion English High School changing its name to "Alumni Athletic Club", due to a regulation from the Association stating that football teams were not allowed to name the same as the Schools they belonged to.

The new denomination was inspired by the Alumni Associations of the United States, formed by ex-students who wanted to keep the ties of friendship with their old schoolmates. Under its new name Alumni retained the Argentine championship by winning all six of its games.

Primera División

The championship continued with the 4 team league format, with each team playing the other twice.

Final standings

Lower divisions

Primera B
Champion: Barracas Athletic

Primera C
Champion: Alumni III

International cup

Tie Cup
Champion:  Alumni

Final

Argentina national team
The Argentina national team made its debut with a 3-2 win against Uruguay in Montevideo. This is considered the first game played ever by Argentina.

Friendly matches

References

 
Seasons in Argentine football
Argentine